Waterfall is an Unincorporated community on the west coast of Prince of Wales Island in Prince of Wales-Hyder Census Area, Alaska, United States, approximately  west of Ketchikan. The primary industry was Waterfall Cannery, built in 1912 as a salmon processing facility. The cannery closed in 1973 and was renovated into the Waterfall Resort, a sport fishing lodge.

Waterfall is not connected to the island's road system; visitors to the resort arrive by floatplane from Ketchikan.

References

External links
 Waterfall Resort

Unincorporated communities in Alaska
Unincorporated communities in Prince of Wales – Hyder Census Area, Alaska
Unincorporated communities in Unorganized Borough, Alaska